Colorado Crew is the collegiate sports club that represents the University of Colorado–Boulder in rowing at a national level. The program was founded in the fall of 1992 by two transfer students from the University of San Diego. Since its founding, the team, in terms of membership and funding, has established itself as one of the largest club sports at the University of Colorado. The men's and women's programs compete in the American Collegiate Rowing Association (ACRA).

Location
Colorado Crew trains on the Boulder Reservoir in Boulder, Colorado. All dry land training is conducted in the University of Colorado's Recreation Center.

References

 Colorado Crew "About Us"

External links
 Colorado Crew - CU Crew official website
 American Collegiate Rowing Association - ACRA official website

Rowing clubs in the United States
Crew